Jerzy Wilk (15 March 1955 – 16 May 2021) was a Polish politician who served as a member of the Sejm. The bridge across the Vistula Spit canal is named in his honor.

Death
Wilk died on 16 May 2021, aged 66, in Elblag, Poland. The cause of death was not disclosed.

References

1955 births
2021 deaths
Members of the Polish Sejm 2015–2019
Members of the Polish Sejm 2019–2023
Mayors of places in Poland
Centre Agreement politicians
Solidarity Electoral Action politicians
Law and Justice politicians
Solidarity (Polish trade union) activists
University of Gdańsk alumni
People from Elbląg
Recipients of the Silver Cross of Merit (Poland)
Recipients of Cross of Freedom and Solidarity